Cunningham is an unincorporated community in Lamar County, Texas, United States.

The Prairiland Independent School District serves area students.

External links
 

Unincorporated communities in Texas
Unincorporated communities in Lamar County, Texas